An-Sophie Mestach (born 7 March 1994) is a Belgian retired tennis player.

In her career, Mestach won two doubles titles on the WTA Tour, as well as six singles titles and eight doubles titles on the ITF Circuit. On 14 September 2015, she reached her career-high singles ranking of world No. 98. On 1 February 2016, she peaked at No. 64 in the doubles rankings.

Ghent-born Mestach won the junior events of the 2011 Australian Open in both singles and doubles. Following these wins, she became the world No. 1 junior. She also won two Grade-A and three Grade-1 tournaments in singles on the junior circuit.

In 2012, Mestach made the final of one ITF event and the semifinals of two others. She ended the year with a ranking of world No. 361.

Playing for the Belgium Fed Cup team since 2010, Mestach has accumulated a win–loss record of 9–6.

Since retirement, Mestach has pursued a career as a police officer. She has also spent time on the professional padel circuit.

WTA career finals

Doubles: 3 (2 titles, 1 runner-up)

ITF Circuit finals

Singles: 17 (6–11)

Doubles: 19 (8–11)

Junior Grand Slam finals

Girls' singles

Girls' doubles

References

External links

 
 
 
 

1994 births
Living people
Sportspeople from Ghent
Belgian female tennis players
Flemish sportspeople
Tennis players at the 2010 Summer Youth Olympics
Australian Open (tennis) junior champions
Grand Slam (tennis) champions in girls' singles
Grand Slam (tennis) champions in girls' doubles
21st-century Belgian women
Female tennis players playing padel